Winter Buoy is a 2015 documentary film directed by the Swedish Cannes-awarded Frida Kempff. The film is about a group of nurses in Toronto helping pregnant women struggle with their homelessness, drug addictions and violent relationships.

The film had its premiere at the 2015 Gothenburg Film Festival where it was nominated to the Dragon Award Best Nordic Documentary. It was awarded Best Documentary at NIFF, Nordic International Film Festival, USA. It was also nominated to the 2015 First Films International Competition at Cinéma du Réel in Paris and to the Tempo Documentary Award at the 2015 Tempo Documentary Festival in Stockholm.

References

External links
Winter Buoy at Internet Movie Database
Winter Buoy at The Swedish Film Institute Database

2015 films
2015 documentary films
Documentary films about health care
Documentary films about violence against women
Documentary films about homelessness in Canada
Documentary films about Toronto
Documentary films about drug addiction
Women in Ontario
2010s English-language films
Violence against women in Canada